David C. Kelly is a professor emeritus of mathematics at Hampshire College in Amherst, Massachusetts. He holds an AB from Princeton, an SM from MIT, and an AM from Dartmouth; and has taught at Oberlin College and Talladega College. In 1971 he founded the Hampshire College Summer Studies in Mathematics (HCSSiM), a six-week program for mathematically talented high school students, and directed the program for many years.

During his time at Princeton in the early 1960s, Kelly and fellow student Michael Spivak  created "Yellow Pig's Day," an annual celebration of mathematics and the number 17. He continues to be involved in the organization of the holiday each year, commemorating the day with food, songs, a reunion, and mathematics. He is quite familiar with many of the properties of the number 17, and gives a special lecture on the subject each summer.

External links
Faculty biography
 
David C. Kelly at Hampmedia
Hampshire College Summer Studies in Mathematics

References

Living people
Hampshire College faculty
Year of birth missing (living people)
Place of birth missing (living people)